Pithecellobium keyense, commonly called  Florida Keys blackbead, is a species of flowering plant in the legume family (Fabaceae). It is native to the West Indies of North America, where it found in The Bahamas, Belize, Cuba, the Mexican states of Quintana Roo and Yucatan, and the U.S. state of Florida. It typically grows over sand and limestone substrates, often near coastal areas. It is a common species throughout much of its range.

Pithecellobium keyense is a shrub or small tree. It has pinnately compound leaves, with 2-4 leaflets. The leaves are evergreen and leathery in texture. Flowers are produced in heads, and range in color from white to pink. Its fruits are a long coiled bean.

References

keyense